Zyn or ZYN may refer to:
 Zyn, a line of cymbals manufactured by Premier Percussion
 ZynAddSubFX or Zyn-Fusion, an open-source software synthesizer
 Zyn, a brand of nicotine pouch produced by Swedish Match
 Nîmes station, France, IATA code